Norshahliza Baharum (born 3 March 1987) is a Malaysian badminton player. Baharum was selected to join the 2004 Uber Cup squad, and the team qualified on merit to the final stage for the first time. The Bukit Jalil Sports School alumni, was the girls' singles champion at the 2004 Asean School Championships, and part of the Malaysia junior team that won the silver medal at the 2005 Asian Junior Championships in the girls' team event after being defeated by the Chinese team in the final. Baharum competed at the 2006 Asian Games in Doha, Qatar. She won the women's doubles title at the 2008 Iran Fajr International tournament with Lim Yin Loo.

Achievements

BWF International Challenge/Series
Women's doubles

Mixed doubles

 BWF International Challenge tournament
 BWF International Series tournament

References

External links
 

1987 births
Living people
Malaysian female badminton players
Badminton players at the 2006 Asian Games
Asian Games competitors for Malaysia
Competitors at the 2005 Southeast Asian Games
Southeast Asian Games bronze medalists for Malaysia
Southeast Asian Games medalists in badminton
21st-century Malaysian women